Christmas Wonderland, also known as Christmas with Bert Kaempfert and Christmastide with Kaempfert, is an instrumental Christmas album by Bert Kaempfert and his orchestra from 1963. It is his only album of Christmas music.

Track listing

References

1963 Christmas albums
Christmas albums by German artists
Decca Records albums
Covers albums
Albums produced by Bert Kaempfert
Bert Kaempfert albums